Pudhu Pudhu Arthangal is an Indian Tamil-language family television drama that airs on Zee Tamil and streams on ZEE5. The series premiered on 22 March 2021 and starring actress Devayani and actor Abhishek Shankar with VJ Parvathy in the lead roles. It is an official remake of Zee Marathi series Aggabai Sasubai. The series ended on 20 November 2022 with 536 episodes.

This is a story that focuses on life of woman "Lakshmi". Lakshmi is a widow, she takes care of her family and faces all life issues with peace. She raised her son "Santhosh" and also takes care of her father-in-law "Thiruvenkadam"  but she always pays less attention to herself while loving everyone else except herself. After the marriage of Santhosh, the show focuses on how Lakshmi's daughter in law "Pavithra" strives to bring a little joy in Lakshmi's life. Now Santhosh and Pavithra tries to get Lakshmi to remarried with Hari Krishnan, (Lakshmi's favorite chef).

Plot
Lakshmi, a widow who lives in "Sneha Apartment", takes care of her family and faces all life issues with peace. She raised her son Santhosh as a single mother and also takes care of her father-in-law Thiruvenkadam. She always pays less attention to herself while loving everyone else except herself. After the marriage of Santhosh with Pavithra, they go to a restaurant and finish their meals. The hotel is owned by Hari Krishnan, a renowned chef . He notices Lakshmi and falls for her. Lakshmi's daughter-in-law Pavithra strives to bring some joy in Lakshmi's life.  The family often visit him and become very close. Hari loves puliyodorai (tamarind rice) in a temple was the prasaadam cooked by a woman (not knowing that is Lakshmi) he wishes to find out that woman. One day he finds Lakshmi cooked puliyodorai in the temple every Friday and his love for Lakshmi increases. Days go on until Prathiba, a cunning lady who is in the next floor of Lakshmi and dislikes Lakshmi and humiliates her every time, ensuring that Lakshmi doesn't live happily. Hari Krishnan insists on making pumpkin cake from Lakshmi but she denies because of Kutty (Santhosh). Prathiba enters and tells that she had made the pumpkin cake. The next day she gets Hari's number from Lakshmi and calls him. A delighted Prathiba asks her friends to come to her home, but she fails to make the cake. Lakshmi, however, makes the cake. Hari thanks Lakshmi, which irritates Prathiba. She uses Santhosh as a weapon against Lakshmi & Hari. He dislikes Hari and confronts Lakshmi. Hari Krishnan doesn't like Santhosh's behavior and humiliates Santhosh in front of his colleagues. This irritates him very much and he confronts Lakshmi.

Few months later

In Sneha's apartment, Hari Krishnan moves in as a tenant because his restaurant had been closed due to Santhosh. This irritates Santhosh very much and he doesn't speak to Lakshmi. Hari Krishnan gets an order, but he rejects the order since he doesn't have a large kitchen and enough of vessels. But Lakshmi suggests getting the help of other flatmates, which leads to the order being successful. Then, Hari Krishnan cooks in a television show that they going to shoot in apartment parking area. This irritates Santhosh. He complaints to municipality corporation, but Pavithra clears the matter and helps the team. Santhosh thinks that Lakshmi had cleared the issue and quarrels with her. The election for secretary election is going to start. One week before the election, they need nominees. Prathiba stands for election. Pavithra tells Lakshmi to stand for election and Lakshmi stands. This irritates Prathiba. She uses Santhosh again. He confronts Lakshmi to not stand in upcoming election, but Pavithra saves Lakshmi. Pavithra cheers on Lakshmi. A frustrated Prathiba plans to swap the election boxes after election is over. But Maddy (Hari Krishnan's personal secretary) finds out and records their conversation and shows it to Hari.

After few months, Aravind (an engaged bridegroom who doesn't have parents but her fiancé belongs to an extended family) is introduced. Her father needs a bridegroom same like his family. But as Aravind loves her fiancé so much that he couldn't leave her, so he lied that his parents are abroad and they will come on the wedding day. Whilst giving out invitations to his friends, he was involved in an accident caused by Santosh with his new car. Lakshmi takes care of Aravind and he doesn't tell the police. Lakshmi visits his fiancé's house where she met Hari who had a plan to act like his father whereas Aravind is his worker. The fiancé's family misunderstood that Lakshmi is Aravind's mother. Then she took acts like his mom as she had no options. On the Wedding day, the fiancé's uncle speaks ill about Lakshmi who doesn't wear her Thali and metti chain, but she is a widow so she can't wear them. Then Hari ties the knot to Lakshmi, as he can't hear the words spoken by uncle. Seeing this Thiruvenkadam and Santhosh was angry and he arranged a ceremony to take off the Thali. Suddenly Lakshmi gets very ill and the ceremony was stopped. She was so serious in hospital Hari Krishnan takes care of her. But Santhosh didn't allow Lakshmi to enter the house so Hari Krishnan takes her to his home and keeps for a week. Pavithra goes to Hari Krishnan's house and takes care of Lakshmi. Later Santhosh and Thiruvenkadam accepts Lakshmi to come back to their house. Lakshmi became a tea master in Santhosh's office. Santhosh disliked his mother's arrival.

Aadhira was transferred from Mumbai to Santhosh's office. Aadhira had a love interest on Santhosh and wished to marry him. Aadhira introduced her father to Santhosh. Days later, Aadhira's father passed away. Adhira asked Santhosh to stay with her as she felt lonely. Santhosh accepted that and stayed with her for some nights but he stayed with her as a good friend. After some days Adhira becomes pregnant but there is no mistake in Santhosh. Lakshmi and Harikrishnan believes Santhosh that there is no mistake in him. Adhira asked Prathiba to give a cover to Pavithra which contained Santhos and Adhira's photos like sleeping on the bed. Pavithra felt angry on Santhosh and Lakshmi for supporting her son. She left the house and Harikrishnan convinced Pavithra and made her to stay in his house. And Santhosh went to Pavithra's house and met her father Raghavan and asked sorry for whatever happened and he told that there is no mistake in him but Raghavan didn't believed him and sent him out.

As Lakshmi was the current apartment secretary Prathiba planned to steal the association money from bank and she set up some people and they called Lakshmi and asked for OTP and told that they will give exciting gifts. Innocent Lakshmi told the OTP and the amount was stolen by Prathiba's brother. Everyone in the association learned that the money was missing in the bank account and some people said Lakshmi stole the money. Prathiba gave police complaint that Lakshmi had stealed 5 lakhs from the bank account. Police arrested Lakshmi. Pavithra sold her jewels and gave the money to police and took Lakshmi in bail. Lakshmi found 5 Lakhs cash in Santhosh's cupboard and the money was stolen by Santhosh's colleague to save Lakshmi. Santhosh told to office MD as he took the money for personal use and Santhosh was sent out.

Cast

Main
 Devayani Rajakumaran as Lakshmi 
 A widow and turned Hari Krishnan's wife, she is kind and a dedicated housewife; Santhosh's mother; Pink FM's radio jockey (2021–2022)
 VJ Parvathy as Pavithra (Pavi) 
 A bold and straight forward girl. She is Santhosh's lover and turned wife; Raghavan and Vaidhei's daughter (2021–2022)
 Abhishek Shankar as Hari Krishnan (Hari)
 A popular celebrity chef and owner of Hari's kitchen restaurant and Lakshmi's husband (2021–2022)
 Niyaz Khan as Santhosh (Kutty): 
 Lakshmi's son; Pavithra's husband and Thiruvenkadam's grandson (2021–2022)

Recurring
 Dindigul I. Leoni (2021) / Jayaraj Periyamayathevar (2021–2022) as Thiruvenkadam: Santhosh's grandfather 
 Devipriya as Prathiba: Lakshmi's neighbor; she hates Lakshmi (2021–2022) 
 K. S. Jayalakshmi as Parimalam: Lakshmi's neighbor and Prathiba's sidekick (2021–2022) 
 Akshaya Kimmy as Maddy: Hari Krishnan's assistant and manager of Hari's kitchen (2021–2022) 
 Karpagavalli as Archana: Lakshmi's neighbor and friend (2021–2022) 
 Swetha as Geetha: Lakshmi's neighbor; Anitha and Anu's mother; Saravanan's second wife (2021–2022) 
 Aishwarya (2021) / Jayashree Binuraj (2021–2022) as Leena: Lakshmi's neighbor and Divya's mother 
 Vincent Roy (2021) / Vijay Krishnaraj (2021–2022) as Natarajan: Komathi's husband, Thiruvenkadam's friend and Lakshmi's neighbor
 Shanthi as Komathi: Natarajan's wife (2021–2022) 
 Vedha Das as Saravanan: Geetha's second husband (2021–2022) 
 Ranjana Sudarshan as Anitha: Geetha's elder daughter (2021–2022) 
 Kamatchi as Anu: Geetha's younger daughter (2021–2022) 
 Ramesh Khanna (2021) / Ashok (2021–2022)  as Raghavan: Pavithra and Arun's father; Santhosh's father-in-law 
 Sheela as Vaidehi: Pavithra and Arun's mother; Santhosh mother-in-law (2021–2022) 
 Varun Udhay as Pink FM's manager (2022)
 Swetha Subramaniam as RJ Aanandhi  Pink FM's staff (2022)
 Vandhana Michael as Sonia: She seeks vengeance against Lakshmi with the help of Prathiba (2022)
 Shalini as Narmadha: Hari Krishnan's college junior
 Tharun Appasamy as Arun: Pavithra's younger brother; Raghavan and Vaidehi's son (2021–2022)
 Sreenidhi Sudharshan as Divya: Leena's daughter, Lakshmi's neighbor and Arun's love interest (2021–2022)
 Rickna as Urmila: Divya's friend (2021–2022)
 Mani Thangarasu as Mani: Arun's friend (2021–2022)
 KPY Sarath as Lokesh: Arun's friend (2021–2022)
 Neethu Chinju (2021–2022) / Sahana Shetty (2022) as Aadhira: Santhosh's Office employee, she loved Santhosh as oneside (dead) 
 Saakshi Siva as Mahesh: Santhosh office Manager (2022)
 Kousalya Senthamarai as Mahesh's mother (2022)
 Shravan Dwaragnath as Aadhira's fake father (2022)
 Visalakshi Manikandan as Aadhira's fake mother (2022)

Cameo
 Aadukalam Naren as Ramanathan: Raghavan's friend (2021)
 Nithya Ravindran as Kamala: Ramanathan's wife (2021)
 Diwakar as an Auto driver (2021)
 Namitha as herself: She came to Sneha apartments for Hari Krishnan's cooking class (2021)
 Vanitha Vijayakumar as herself: She came for an interview with Lakshmi at Pink FM (2022)
 RJ Balaji as Elango: The school teacher (From the character of Veetla Vishesham movie, 2022)
 Aparna Balamurali as Sowmya: Elango's lover (From the character of Veetla Vishesham movie, 2022)
 Rachitha Mahalakshmi as Adv. Jansi Rani (2022)
 Nachathira
 Vishnu
 Sanjeev Venkat

Production

Casting
The series features film actress Devayani, make her comeback after 2 years on television in the main female role of Lakshmi. Actor Abhishek Shankar was chosen for the male role, who acted with Devayani as her pair in the TV series Kolangal, both made their combo after 12 years on television. "Sun TV" presenter Parvathy, made her first acting debut on television, was roped in the role of Lakshmi's daughter-in-law. Alongside TV actor Niyaz Khan was selected as the role of Lakshmi's son and debates anchor Dindigul I. Leonie role of Lakshmi's father-in-law.

Release

Promo
The first promo was released on 8 March 2021, International Women's Day, to implies the women's life. Then the second promo was released on 15 March 2021 with launching date and timing on YouTube.

Special episodes

On its launching, the series had been telecast one hour for two days with non-stop episode without any commercial breaks.
On 17 October 2021, Pudhu Pudhu Arthangal helds a wedding episode titled as Pudhu Pudhu Arthangal Mega Thirumana Vaibhavam for Harikrishnan and Lakshmi's marriage, which aired for non-stop two and half hours on Sunday.
From 13 December 2021 to 25 December 2021, this series held a forty-five minutes special episode in prime time.
On 16 January 2022, this series held a two and half hour special episode on Sunday regarding pregnancy of Aadhira, titled as Pudhu Pudhu Arthangal MEGA Sunday Kondattam.
On 21 August 2022, this series held a special episode on Sunday regarding Bailling out Hari Krishnan from False Case, titled as Pudhu Pudhu Arthangal Sunday Special.

Reception
The Times of India quoted the series that "The series deals with the hardships and emotional turmoil faced by a dutiful housewife despite her sacrifices to the family".

Adaptations

References

External links 
 
 Pudhu Pudhu Arthangal at ZEE5

Zee Tamil original programming
Tamil-language romance television series
Tamil-language melodrama television series
2021 Tamil-language television series debuts
Tamil-language television shows
Television shows set in Tamil Nadu
Tamil-language television series based on Marathi-language television series
2022 Tamil-language television series endings